Pusaka is a 2019 Malaysian Malay-language horror film directed by Razaisyam Rashid and written by Anwari Ashraf and Alfie Palermo. Syafiq Kyle stars as Inspector Nuar Ishak who discovers twins Balqis and Qistina, one dead and one alive, trapped in an abandoned house. Since heading the investigation for this case, Inspector Nuar begins experiencing paranormal disturbances and although he realises his judgement is progressively affected and also has problems with his own twin, Nur, he must solve the case before more lives are lost.

It was released on 31 October 2019 in Malaysia, Singapore and Brunei.

Plot 
Nuar and Nur are twins. Nuar, a skilled cop, finds his sister Nur, a drug addict, at a warehouse. Nuar is tired of Nur because she always leaves the rehab center to hide in the warehouse. After a heated argument, Nuar sends Nur back to the rehab center. The police dispatch calls Nuar about the stench of corpses, then Nuar goes to an abandoned house. Nuar goes inside the house and encounters a few sightings and weird sounds (sound of a dropping marble on a floor), but he thinks nothing of it. On the second level, he finds a girl, chained and holding a corpse.

Later, he learns that the survivor was Balqis, and had been holding her deceased twin sister Qistina. They are the daughters of Megat Mahmud. Nuar becomes more interested in the case, as he find it strange that nobody had even reported the twins missing. When Nuar returns home, things start to feel weird - he hears and sees things. His hand is grabbed by a ghost and the mark turns blue. 

Later that evening, Balqis is possessed and vomits blood. A note reveals that Faizah's spirit is attacking Khaleeda. Nuar, Lokman and a police officer rush to Faizah's house. Nuar tries to save her, but is pushed by Faizah's spirit. Lokman recites prayers to exorcise Faizah's spirit out of her body and she is arrested.

The next morning, Nuar interviews Faizah at police station. After Faizah is possessed, she attacks Nuar and runs away. Nuar tries to chase her but she dies in a car accident. Nuar meets Balqis and she explains that their parents were also killed in a road accident. Opah locks Balqis and Qistina at the abandoned house. Faizah goes to the abandoned house along with some food. However, she is shocked that Qistina was killed along with skulls.

Nuar is suspected and arrested by ASP Mansor for the murders of Opah and Megat Mahmud. He is sent to jail.

At the abandoned house, Nuar and Lokman find out that Khaleeda has been brought by Balqis. Lokman is attacked by spirit of Balqis. Nuar finally meets Nur along with Balqis's spirit, attacking Nuar. As Nuar shoots Balqis, she falls down. But Nur's spirit also attacked Nuar. The cabinet seems to fall down on Balqis, allowing Nuar to pull Balqis's ring in front of her finger before rushing to save Nur. Finally, Luqman saves Khaleeda. Nur is cured, but Nuar is injured.

Two months later, Nuar has recovered and is brought back to the police force, while Nur's has a broken arm. Nuar and Nur enjoy sitting on the bench, along with Luqman. In the mid-credits scene, Khaleeda get on the bus, but we see Balqis has returned.

Cast 
 Syafiq Kyle as Inspektor Nuar Ishak
 Mimi Lana as Nur Ishak
 Hafidz Roshdi as Luqman
 Faizal Hussein as ASP Mansor
 Sweet Qismina as Balqis Megat Mahmud/Qistina Megat Mahmud
 Draman Muhammad as Megat Mahmud
 Ogy Ahmad Daud as Opah/ Puteri Najwa
 Aleza Shadan as Faizah
 Yuna Rahim as Khaleeda	
 Faizul Syaharin as Haikal
 Aloy Paradox as Hanif
 Megat Sharizal as Salman

Box office 
Pusaka has grossed over RM 11 Million after 18 days of theatrical release.

References

External links 
 Pusaka in Cinema.com.my

Malaysian horror films